Pinal Airpark , also known as Pinal County Airpark, is a non-towered, county-owned, public-use airport located  northwest of the central business district of Marana, in Pinal County, Arizona, United States. Silverbell Army Heliport  is co-located with Pinal Airpark. The heliport is a private-use military facility operated by the Arizona Army National Guard.

Pinal Airpark's primary function is to serve as a boneyard for civilian commercial aircraft, where the area's dry desert climate mitigates corrosion of the aircraft. It is the largest commercial aircraft storage and heavy maintenance facility in the world. Even so, many aircraft which are brought here wind up being scrapped. Nearby the 309th Aerospace Maintenance and Regeneration Group at Davis-Monthan Air Force Base provides the same service to the United States federal government.

Aircraft at Pinal Airpark include those formerly operated by Cathay Dragon, Cathay Pacific, Delta Air Lines, Northwest Airlines, Aerosur, Hellenic, Surinam Airways, and other carriers.

History 
Built in 1942 by the Sundt and Del Webb Construction Companies and opened in March 1943, the facility was known as Marana Army Air Field. During World War II, the airfield was under the command of the 389th Army Air Force Base Unit, AAF West Coast Training Center and used as a training base, as part of the 50,000 Pilot Training Program.

Marana conducted basic flight training and the training of transport pilots in instrument flying and navigation, being the home of the 3024th (Pilot School, Basic). Chinese pilots were also trained there. Five satellite airfields were established for Marana during World War II:
 Picacho Field Aux #1 (currently Picacho Stagefield ARNG Heliport )
 Rillito Field Aux #2 (currently reused as Marana Regional Airport )
 Coronado Field Aux #3
 Avra Field Aux #4
 Sahuaro Field Aux #5 (currently El Tiro Gliderport )

The infrastructure installed at Marana during World War II was extensive. This included water, sewer, and gas systems that were still used until some problems developed in the 1990s. There was also a massive storm drain system. The airfield also had a railroad spur line and railroad station.

Marana was closed after World War II and in 1948, after the establishment of the U.S. Air Force as an independent service, Pinal County accepted a deed to the property, subsequent to the Air Force's disposal of most of the buildings, waterlines, gas lines, and electrical lines. From 1948 to 1951, Pinal County leased the property to multiple tenants, and from 1951 to 1956, Marana was reused as a contractor-operated USAF basic flying school, operated by Darr Aeronautical Technical Company.

Marana became the headquarters of all Central Intelligence Agency air operations during the Vietnam War years, when it was the primary facility of Intermountain Airlines, a wholly owned CIA "front" company which was used to supply covert operations in Southeast Asia and elsewhere. Intermountain was infamous for its thinly veiled CIA special ops which included development and use of the Fulton Skyhook, but its cover was its non-scheduled freight and maintenance operations. Marana was the principal continental United States maintenance base for Southeast Asia CIA operations including Air America and Continental Air Services. The Marana facility was subsequently acquired by Evergreen International Airlines which performed aircraft modification and maintenance at the airfield.

Pinal Airpark was also the first home of Marana Skydiving Center operated by Greg Berhens and Tony Frost before moving to Avra Valley Airport in 1991.

Current usage

Pinal Airport
The airport is home to many private companies including: Ascent Aviation Services and Jet Yard Solutions, Aircraft Demolition, and Jet Yard.

Since the early 2010s, airport economic development director Jim Petty has opened the facility to the public, giving free tours of the airport and the airplanes stored there.

Silverbell Army Heliport
Pinal Airpark is co-located with Silverbell Army Heliport (SAHP). The 98th Aviation Troop Command, the Western Army National Guard Aviation Training Site (WAATS) and other numerous Army National Guard units are located inside SAHP. WAATS discontinued training of the AH-64 Apache attack helicopter at the site in 2012. Currently WAATS provides training for the UH-72A Lakota.

Pinal Airpark and SAHP also hosts the US Special Operations Command's Parachute Training and Testing Facility. On 28 March 2013, Navy SEAL Brett Shadle was killed during parachute training here and another SEAL was injured.

Facilities and aircraft
For the 12-month period ending 1 April 2020, the airport had 58,200 aircraft operations, an average of 159 per day: 86% military and 14% general aviation.

Notable aircraft
One of the notable aircraft assigned to Marana during its CIA years was a Boeing B-17G Flying Fortress, AAF Serial 44–85531. As of September 1957, the aircraft was registered to Western Enterprises Inc., a paramilitary front company founded by the CIA in 1951 for operations in Taiwan. In late 1957, missions were staged from Kurmitola Air Field in East Pakistan (now Bangladesh) to parachute agents into Tibet. The aircraft was disassembled for parts at Clark Air Base, Philippines between March and October 1958, and it is believed that this plane was eventually scrapped. The serial number 44-85531 appeared again as registered on another B-17G, 1 September 1960 registered to Atlantic General Enterprise, Washington DC (another CIA front) as N809Z. These registration numbers were then changed to the true numbers of 44–83785. Based again at Marana, this aircraft later flew black operations over Vietnam and was used to retrieve two American agents from an abandoned Soviet scientific base in the Arctic using the Fulton Skyhook in Operation Coldfeet.

Gallery

See also

 Arizona World War II Army Airfields
 37th Flying Training Wing (World War II)
 Pacific Corporation
 List of airports in Arizona

References

Other sources

 
 Manning, Thomas A. (2005), History of Air Education and Training Command, 1942–2002. Office of History and Research, Headquarters, AETC, Randolph AFB, Texas 
 Shaw, Frederick J. (2004), Locating Air Force Base Sites, History’s Legacy, Air Force History and Museums Program, United States Air Force, Washington DC

External links

 Pinal Airpark (MZJ) at Arizona DOT airport directory
 Field Guide To Aircraft Boneyards: Pinal Airpark
 Map Explorer article 
 Marana Army Airfield in World War II 
 

1942 establishments in Arizona
Airports established in 1942
Airports in Pinal County, Arizona
World War II airfields in the United States
Airfields of the United States Army Air Forces in Arizona
Aircraft boneyards
USAAF Western Flying Training Command
American Theater of World War II
Aviation in Arizona